The 2014 Elections for the Illinois House of Representatives were conducted on Tuesday, November 4, 2014. State Representatives are elected for two-year terms, with the entire House of Representatives elected every two years.  Despite a small swing against the Democrats, there was no net seat change between the two major parties after this election. The Democrats maintained their three-fifths super-majority.

Overview

External links
Illinois State Board of Elections

2014 Illinois elections
2014
Illinois House of Representatives